The 2013 Parachinar bombing occurred on 26 July 2013. At least 57 people were killed and more than 100 injured after two bombs exploded on a market in Parachinar a capital city in Kurram Valley and the largest city of the Federally Administered Tribal Areas in northern Pakistan on Friday the official said. The blast took place near the Afghan border and  Shi'ite mosques. On 27 July 2013 the death toll rise to 57.

See also
 Terrorist incidents in Pakistan in 2013

References

2013 murders in Pakistan
21st-century mass murder in Pakistan
Mass murder in 2013
Improvised explosive device bombings in Pakistan
Terrorist incidents in Pakistan in 2013
Crime in Khyber Pakhtunkhwa
2013
Attacks on buildings and structures in Pakistan
Marketplace attacks in Asia